Karly Roestbakken (born 17 January 2001) is an Australian professional soccer player who plays as a centre-back for Melbourne City in the A-League Women in Australia.

Club career

Canberra United
On 26 November 2016, Roestbakken made her professional debut aged 15 in a W-League match against the Newcastle Jets. In Canberra's next match, Roestbakken came on as a half-time substitute and became the second-youngest goalscorer in W-League history when she netted an 83rd-minute winner in a 2–1 victory over Melbourne City. She continued to play as part of the Canberra United Academy side in the NPLW Capital Football league, captaining the team to a Federation Cup Final in 2018. By the beginning of her third season, a high level of roster turnover meant she was the second longest serving Canberra player that season behind Nickoletta Flannery.

In December 2018, Roestbakken was nominated for the W-League young footballer of the year, eventually winning the award.

For the 2019-20 season, Roestbakken was appointed the co-captain of Canberra United alongside Nikola Orgill. She was 18 years old at the time of the appointment.

LSK Kvinner
In April 2020, Roestbakken transferred to the Norwegian champions, LSK Kvinner FK. Although due to the COVID-19 pandemic there was uncertainty about when she could join her new team due to the border closures.

She debuted for the Norwegian club in the first game of the 2020 Toppserien season on 3 July, playing the full 90 minutes against Rosenborg.

On 14 October 2020, Roestbakken extended her contract with LSK Kvinner until the end of the 2022 Toppserien season.

Loan to Canberra United
On the eve of the 2021–22 A-League Women season, Roestbakken was loaned back to Canberra United for a season.

Melbourne City
In October 2022, Roestbakken joined A-League Women club Melbourne City.

International
In 2018, Roestbakken was called up to the Australia Under-20 squad. She was 16 at the time. She was part of the team that qualified for the 2019 AFC U-19 Women's Championship, winning all six of their qualification games.

On 6 June 2019, Roestbakken was promoted from the standby list to the senior Australia squad for the 2019 World Cup, replacing the injured Laura Alleway. Her U20 manager, Gary van Egmond, also acts as assistant with the senior team and had previously hinted at her chances of making the squad despite being uncapped, praising the teenager's work rate, technique and desire for the game. She made her senior debut as a stoppage time substitute in Australia's second group game of the World Cup, a 3–2 victory over Brazil.

Personal life
Roestbakken's father, Jack, played semi-professional football in the 2. divisjon of his native Norway before moving to Australia. Her older brother, Sam Roestbakken, is also a footballer and most recently played with NPL1 team Monaro Panthers. She attended Merici College and graduated in 2018.

Career statistics

Club 

1Norwegian Cup.
2UEFA Women's Champions League

International

References 

Living people
2001 births
Australian women's soccer players
Women's association football midfielders
Canberra United FC players
LSK Kvinner FK players
Melbourne City FC (A-League Women) players
2019 FIFA Women's World Cup players
Australia women's international soccer players
Toppserien players
Australian expatriate women's soccer players
Expatriate women's footballers in Norway
Australian expatriate sportspeople in Norway
Australian people of Norwegian descent
People from Queanbeyan
Sportswomen from New South Wales
Soccer players from New South Wales